The Sex Thief is a 1973 British sex comedy film starring David Warbeck, Diane Keen and Christopher Biggins. It was an early film credit for director Martin Campbell.

The film was released in North America (in January 1976) as Her Family Jewels, with added hardcore inserts performed by stand-ins for the original cast members.

Keen, quoted in the book The Worlds Greatest Scandals of the 20th Century, claimed: "Times were pretty hard and this is a comedy which I am not ashamed at having made. But it was bought by a company, which drafted in other actresses to make it look like I was doing erotic things from start to finish. It became incredibly filthy." The hardcore version was later released on video in The Netherlands (under the name Handful of Diamonds).    
The film was written by Tudor Gates and Michael Armstrong under the name Edward Hyde.

During the 2007 series of I'm a Celebrity... Get Me Out of Here!, Biggins failed to get a question right about his character's name in the film as part of a bushtucker trial. He groaned, "The Sex Thief, god, that was a million years ago."

Plot
Grant Henry (David Warbeck), a writer of trashy paperbacks like The Dirty and the Dying, moonlights as a masked jewel thief who is usually caught in the act but is able to get away with his crimes by luring his female victims to bed. After these women lie to the police about the thief's identity ("who could disguise himself as a clubfooted coloured midget one week and a 6′6″ Russian with a harelip the next") and seem to want to get burgled again, the Inspector in charge of the case (Terence Edmond) and an insurance investigator trained in kung fu (Diane Keen) decide to lay a trap for the thief.

Cast
David Warbeck as Grant Henry
Diane Keen as Judy Martin
Terence Edmond as Insp. Robert Smith
Deirdre Costello as Jezebel Lorraine (as Linda Coombes)
Michael Armstrong as Sgt. Plinth
Christopher Neil as Guy Hammond
Jennifer Westbrook as Emily Barrow (as Jenny Westbrook)
Harvey Hall as Jacobi
Christopher Biggins as Lord 'Porky' Prescott
Christopher Mitchell as Ian Wensleydale
Eric Deacon as Crabshaw

Censorship history
The Sex Thief was heavily cut by the British Board of Film Censors on its original release; cuts were made to the scene where the naked girl dances in front of Grant, and the inter-cutting between a further sex scene and a wrestling match. The film's speeded-up sex scene was ‘considerably reduced’, as was the scene where a handcuffed Grant is seduced by Judy. The current US and UK DVD releases are uncut.

Appearance in Texas murder trial
The movie appeared as incriminating evidence in the 1987 trial against Michael Morton, wrongly convicted for murdering his wife. It was shown to the jury, in an effort to make them negatively disposed to Morton.

Alternative version
The US Her Family Jewels/Handful of Diamonds version runs approximately 81 minutes (as opposed to the original 89-minute running time) and adds hardcore inserts to every sex scene as well as an innocuous scene where the characters played by Terence Edmond and Diane Keen discuss the thief in a crowded pub, in which the hardcore inserts imply the two characters are masturbating each other under the table. Her Family Jewels deletes several narrative scenes that appear in the original version of the film—most notably the end credits and a subplot involving two detectives trying to sell pornographic films—but adds several newly shot hardcore scenes, in which footage of David Warbeck (taken from elsewhere in the film) has been briefly inserted. These scenes are scored to the pop song "Well Here I Go", which does not appear in the original film.

References

External links 

1973 films
1970s English-language films
British sex comedy films
Films directed by Martin Campbell
1970s sex comedy films
1973 directorial debut films
1973 comedy films
1970s British films